Paul Eduard Richard Sohn (11 November 1834, Düsseldorf - 9 March 1912, Düsseldorf) was a German genre painter. His younger brother, Karl Rudolf, was also a well known painter.

Biography 
He was born to the artist, Karl Ferdinand Sohn, and his wife Emilie Auguste née Von Mülmann (1805-1884); a sister of the government councillor, .
In 1851, he completed his public school education at the "Städtischen Realschule" (now the ""). 

His first artistic studies were with his father. After 1855, he attended the master classes taught by Friedrich Wilhelm Schadow. From 1860 to 1862, he took private lessons from Rudolf Jordan, who was married to his mother's youngest sister, Sophie.

In 1867, he made a study trip to Paris. He was also influenced by the work of his cousin,  Wilhelm Sohn, although he remained generally true to the styles of the Düsseldorf school of painting. His works sold very well in the United States. Beginning in the 1870s, he also painted the occasional portrait; including one of Kaiser Wilhelm I. He was also a member of the progressive artists' group, Malkasten, and served as their librarian. 

Described by his sister-in-law, Else Sohn-Rethel, as "quiet and inconspicuous", he never married and, after 1870, lived with his mother. Following her death in 1884, he moved to a modest home of his own and opened a studio nearby.

References

Further reading
 Hans Paffrath (Ed.): Lexikon der Düsseldorfer Malerschule 1819–1918. Vol.3: Nabert–Zwecker, Kunstmuseum Düsseldorf and the Galerie Paffrath. Bruckmann, Munich 1998, pg.299f
 Sabine Schroyen: Quellen zur Geschichte des Künstlervereins Malkasten. Archivhefte 24, Rheinland-Verlag, 1992, pg.264
 Siegfried Weiß: "Sohn, Richard", In Allgemeines Künstlerlexikon Online. Berlin, New York: K. G. Saur, 2009

External links 

1834 births
1912 deaths
19th-century German painters
19th-century German male artists
German genre painters
Kunstakademie Düsseldorf alumni
Artists from Düsseldorf